Rorig Bridge is a historic Pratt through truss bridge located at Westfield in Chautauqua County, New York. It was constructed in 1890 by the Groton Bridge and Manufacturing Company and spans Chautauqua Creek.

It was listed on the National Register of Historic Places in 1983.

References

Road bridges on the National Register of Historic Places in New York (state)
Bridges completed in 1890
Transportation buildings and structures in Chautauqua County, New York
National Register of Historic Places in Chautauqua County, New York
Pratt truss bridges in the United States